Assi Nortia (1925–1989) was a Finnish film actress.

Selected filmography
 A Night in Rio (1951)
 Adventure in Morocco (1953)

References

Bibliography 
 Pietari Kääpä. Directory of World Cinema: Finland. Intellect Books, 2012.

External links 
 

1925 births
1989 deaths
Finnish film actresses
Actors from Vyborg